The Zinalrothorn (4,221 m) is a mountain in the Pennine Alps in Switzerland. Its name comes from the village of Zinal lying on the north side and from the German word Rothorn which means Red Peak. When it was first climbed in 1864 the mountain was known locally as Moming.

Geography

The Zinalrothorn is one of the high summits separating the Matter valley on the east and the Val d'Anniviers (or more precisely the Val de Zinal) on the west. The summit of the Weisshorn (4,505 m) is located 5 km to the north and the Dent Blanche 7 km to the west. At the western foot of the mountain lies the large Zinal Glacier and, on the northern side, the Moming Glacier. L'Epaule (the shoulder) is a minor summit lying at the base of the northern ridge.

The villages of Täsch and Zermatt are the closest while Zinal on the north-west is located further (9 km).

Climbing history

The first ascent was made on 22 August 1864 via the north ridge by Leslie Stephen and Florence Crauford Grove with guides Jakob Anderegg and Melchior Anderegg (AD). They left Zinal at 1 a.m. and ascended the Zinal Glacier. They reached the shoulder from the ridge connecting the Blanc de Moming at the base of the northern ridge at 9 a.m. The traverse of the ridge to the summit took them 2 hours, Stephen wrote later that it was 'the nastiest piece of climbing I have ever accomplished'.

The slightly less difficult normal route, the south-east ridge, was first climbed by the combined parties of Clinton Thomas Dent with guide Alexander Burgener, and George Augustus Passingham, with guides Ferdinand Imseng and Franz Andermatten on 5 September 1872.

The first winter and ski ascent was by Marcel Kurz and T. Theytaz on 7 February 1914.

In the 1880s Mrs Aubrey Le Blond, the first president of the Ladies' Alpine Club, left her detachable skirt by mistake up the Zinalrothorn. To preserve her modesty, she made the decision to climb the mountain a second time to retrieve it rather than return to Zermatt in trousers.

See also

List of 4000 metre peaks of the Alps

References

Bibliography 
 Dumler, Helmut and Willi P. Burkhardt, The High Mountains of the Alps, London: Diadem, 1994
 Collomb, Robin G., (ed.), Pennine Alps Central, London: Alpine Club, 1975

External links
 The Zinalrothorn on SummitPost
 The Zinalrothorn on MountWiki
 The Zinalrothorn on Hikr

Alpine four-thousanders
Mountains of the Alps
Mountains of Valais
Pennine Alps
Mountains of Switzerland
Four-thousanders of Switzerland